The 1920 VFL Grand Final was an Australian rules football game contested between the Richmond Football Club and Collingwood Football Club, held at the Melbourne Cricket Ground in Melbourne on 2 October 1920. It was the 23rd annual Grand Final of the Victorian Football League, staged to determine the premiers for the 1920 VFL season. The match, attended by 53,908 spectators, was won by Richmond by a margin of 17 points, marking that club's first VFL/AFL premiership victory.

Score

Teams

 Umpire - Jack Elder

Statistics

Goalkickers

References
AFL Tables: 1920 Grand Final

See also
 1920 VFL season

VFL/AFL Grand Finals
Grand
Richmond Football Club
Collingwood Football Club
October 1920 sports events